The 2006 AFC U-19 Women's Championship was the third instance of the AFC U-19 Women's Championship. It was held from April 8 to 18, 2006 in Kuala Lumpur, Malaysia. Top three qualified for the 2006 FIFA U-20 Women's World Championship.

It was the first AFC tournament in which Australia participated in.

Qualification

Automatically qualified
 (2004 Champions)
 (2004 Runners-up)
 (2004 Third place)
 (Hosts)

Qualified Teams

Group stage

Group A

Group B

Knockout stage

Semi-finals

Third place match

Final

Winners

External links 
 AFC U-19 Women's Championship Kuala Lumpur 2006
 Asian Women U-19 Championship 2006

 
women
AFC U-19 Women's Championship
Sport in Kuala Lumpur
2006
2006 in youth association football
2006 in Malaysian women's sport